The Times-Independent (sometimes abbreviated The T-I) is a family owned and operated weekly newspaper located in Moab, Utah and serving Grand County, Utah. 

The company is the successor to the Grand Valley Times (started 1896) and Moab Independent, which merged in 1919.

References

Newspapers published in Utah
Grand County, Utah